A ton container is a steel, cylindrical barrel equivalent in length and diameter to two stacked 55-gallon drums. A ton container weighs approximately 1,600 pounds and measures nearly seven feet in length.

The United States Army has used ton containers to store and ship bulk chemicals, including chemical agent, since the 1930s.

Ton containers are also used to store chemicals in water treatment plants.

References

Containers